"Kao ti i ja" is a song recorded by Croatian singer Franka Batelić. The song was released by Karpo Media on June 28, 2018. It was written by Branimir Mihaljević and Neno Ninčević and produced by Mihaljević.

Commercial performance
"Kao ti i ja" debuted at number eight on the Croatian HR Top 40, marking her fourth appearance and second top ten debut on the chart.
Later it peaked at number 3.

Track listing

Charts

Release history

References

External links

2018 singles
Franka Batelić songs
2018 songs